Lacrampe is a French surname. Notable people with the surname include:

André Jean René Lacrampe (1941–2015), French Roman Catholic archbishop
Thierry Lacrampe (born 1988), French rugby union player

French-language surnames